Vincențiu is a Romanian given name

 Vincențiu Babeș (1821 - 1907) ethnic Romanian lawyer, teacher, journalist and politician from the Banat
 , Romanian bishop

Romanian masculine given names